Kristian Wilkerson (born January 10, 1997) is an American football wide receiver for the Indianapolis Colts of the National Football League (NFL). He played college football at Southeast Missouri State.

College career
Wilkerson was a member of the Southeast Missouri State Redhawks for five seasons, redshirting as a true freshman. As a redshirt senior, he caught 71 passes for 1,350 yards and 10 touchdowns and was named first-team All-Ohio Valley Conference and a second-team All-American by HERO Sports. Wilkerson finished his collegiate career with 219 receptions for 3,540 yards and 33 touchdowns, all of which were school records.

Professional career

Tennessee Titans
Wilkerson was signed by the Tennessee Titans as an undrafted free agent on May 4, 2020. He was waived on September 5, 2020, during final roster cuts.

New England Patriots
Wilkerson was signed to the New England Patriots practice squad on September 8, 2020. Wilkerson was elevated to the Patriots active roster on November 9, 2020, and made his debut that night on Monday Night Football in a 30–27 win over the New York Jets. He reverted to the practice squad after the game.

Wilkerson signed a reserve/future contract on January 4, 2021. On August 31, 2021, he was released, but signed with the practice squad the following day.

On January 2, 2022, Wilkerson was elevated for the Week 17 game against Jacksonville and scored his first two NFL touchdowns. He signed a reserve/future contract with the Patriots on January 17, 2022.

On August 30, 2022, Wilkerson was placed on injured reserve. On February 15, 2023, the Patriots waived Wilkerson.

Indianapolis Colts
On February 16, 2023, Wilkerson was claimed off waivers by the Indianapolis Colts.

References

External links
Southeast Missouri State Redhawks bio
New England Patriots bio

1997 births
Living people
American football wide receivers
Southeast Missouri State Redhawks football players
New England Patriots players
Players of American football from Memphis, Tennessee
African-American players of American football
21st-century African-American sportspeople
Indianapolis Colts players